The National Basketball League Finals Most Valuable Player is an annual National Basketball League (NBL) award currently given to the best performing player over the NBL's annual Final Four weekend. The award has previously been known as Final MVP and Final Four MVP.

The origin of the award began with a "Final MVP" that was awarded between 2004 and 2006. Between 2008 and 2012, a "Finals MVP" was awarded to the best player of the best-of-three championship round (2008–10) and then the best player of the Final Four weekend (2011–12). A "Final Four MVP" was introduced for 2013 and 2014 before a switch back to Finals MVP every year between 2015 and 2018. Every year between 2019 and 2022, a "Grand Final MVP" was awarded.

Winners

Final MVP (2004–06)

Finals MVP (2008–12)

Final Four MVP (2013–14)

Finals MVP (2015–18)

Grand Final MVP (2019–22)

See also
 List of National Basketball League (New Zealand) awards

References

Awards established in 2004
mvp
Most Valuable Player